The Borden Ranch AVA is an American Viticultural Area located in both Sacramento County and San Joaquin County, California. It is part of the larger Lodi AVA. The northern edge of the AVA is defined by Laguna Creek and the southern edge is defined by Dry Creek, both of which flow out of the foothills of the Sierra Nevada Mountains into the San Joaquin Valley. The soils in Borden Ranch is alluvial with cobbles, clay pan, and clay loam. Red wine grape varietals are the most commercially important grapes in the area.

Wineries 
Borden Ranch AVA is dominated by the vineyards of Delicato Family Vineyards, Sutter Home Winery, and Woodbridge by Robert Mondavi.

References

American Viticultural Areas
American Viticultural Areas of California
Geography of Sacramento County, California
Geography of San Joaquin County, California
2006 establishments in California